Aydamun (also spelled as Aidamoun or Aaidamoun) is  a Lebanese village.

Location 
It is located in Akkar District, about 15 minutes away from Kouachra, and 3 hours from the capital Beirut.

History
In 1838, Eli Smith noted  ''Aidemun  as a "Greek Christians" and Turkmen village, located east of esh-Sheikh Muhammed.

Population 
It has a population of about 4,000 people, 66% of whom are of Sunni Turkish origin. Christians comprise the remainder (80% are Greek Orthodox, and 20% are Maronite). Due to its Turkish ethnic links, the village has received Turkish developmental assistance and funding. However, its Turkish links are not as strong as the nearby Turkish-populated village of Kouachra. In 1966 the village had a population of about 300 people, and it was famous for producing Akkar carpets, which were home-produced by the local women.

See also 
Turks in Lebanon

References

Bibliography

External links 
Aaidamoun – Chikhlar, Localiban

Populated places in Akkar District
Sunni Muslim communities in Lebanon